Holcomb is a city in Finney County, Kansas, United States.  As of the 2020 census, the population of the city was 2,245.

History
Holcomb took its name from a local hog farmer.  The city was a station and shipping point on the Atchison, Topeka and Santa Fe Railway.  The first post office in Holcomb was established in December 1909.

1959 murders

The town of Holcomb was thrust into national and, eventually, international notoriety after November 15, 1959, when four members of the prominent Clutter family (father Herbert, 48; his wife Bonnie, 45; their youngest daughter, Nancy, 16; and son Kenyon, 15) were found bound and shot to death in various rooms of their home, on the family's River Valley Farm on the outskirts of Holcomb.

Two ex-convicts, Richard ("Dick") Hickock and Perry Smith, were arrested, tried, and convicted of the killings. It started when both Hickock and Smith were released from prison and, acting on jailhouse information by a cellmate of Hickock's named Floyd Wells (who had worked for Mr. Clutter in 1948), made plans to rob the Clutter household under the mistaken belief that Mr. Clutter, according to Wells, kept thousands of dollars in cash in a safe at the residence. There was no Clutter safe, nor was there any substantial amount of cash in the home. Upon this discovery, and after killing the captive family to eliminate any witnesses, the pair fled with around $42, a portable radio, and one pair of binoculars. They were arrested on December 30, 1959, in Las Vegas, Nevada after possibly having murdered another family in Florida. Following their convictions and several appeals, Hickock and Smith were hanged for first-degree murder on April 14, 1965.

The murders, arrests and convictions of Hickock and Smith were the basis for author Truman Capote's acclaimed book In Cold Blood, which was serialized in The New Yorker magazine in 1965 and first published in book form in 1966. Capote actually began work on the book several days after he read a news article in a New York paper in 1959 about the murders.

The best-selling book, in turn, spawned several filmed versions of the story: director Richard Brooks' theatrical feature film In Cold Blood in 1967 starring Robert Blake, Scott Wilson and John Forsythe, and a two-part 1996 TV miniseries adaptation starring Eric Roberts, Anthony Edwards and Sam Neill that aired on network TV in 1996. Portions of the 1967 theatrical film were shot on location in and around Holcomb and nearby Garden City, including the actual house where the crimes took place.

The 2005 movie Capote, directed by Bennett Miller, is also about the author Capote, and the crimes in Holcomb. The 2006 film Infamous, starring Toby Jones as Capote, covers much of the same material.

Geography

Climate
According to the Köppen Climate Classification system, Holcomb has a semi-arid climate, abbreviated "BSk" on climate maps.

Demographics

2010 census
As of the census of 2010, there were 2,094 people, 654 households, and 521 families living in the city. The racial makeup of the city was 86.6% White, 0.3% African American, 0.4% Native American, 0.2% Asian, 9.2% from other races, and 3.2% from two or more races. Hispanic or Latino of any race were 0.5% of the population.

There were 654 households, of which 56.1% had children under the age of 18 living with them, 61.8% were married couples living together, 12.1% had a female householder with no husband present, 5.8% had a male householder with no wife present, and 20.3% were non-families. 16.8% of all households were made up of individuals, and 4.7% had someone living alone who was 65 years of age or older. The average household size was 3.20 and the average family size was 3.62.

The median age in the city was 28.9 years. 37.8% of residents were under the age of 18; 8.2% were between the ages of 18 and 24; 28.9% were from 25 to 44; 21% were from 45 to 64; and 4.1% were 65 years of age or older. The gender makeup of the city was 50.0% male and 50.0% female.

2000 census
As of the census of 2000, there were 2,026 people, 592 households, and 515 families living in the city. The racial makeup of the city was 80.80% White, 1.09% African American, 0.89% Native American, 0.30% Asian, 13.28% from other races, and 3.65% from mixed race.

There were 592 households, out of which 65.0% had children under the age of 18 living with them, 64.9% were married couples living together, 17.2% had a female householder with no husband present, and 13.0% were non-families. 10.1% of all households were made up of individuals, and 2.2% had someone living alone who was 65 years of age or older. The average household size was 3.42 and the average family size was 3.62.

In the city, the population was spread out, with 41.7% under the age of 18, 8.5% from 18 to 24, 32.7% from 25 to 44, 14.8% from 45 to 64, and 2.3% who were 65 years of age or older. The median age was 25 years. For every 100 females, there were 97.9 males. For every 100 females age 18 and over, there were 90.5 males.

The median income for a household in the city was $47,115, and the median income for a family was $48,587. Males had a median income of $31,250 versus $22,652 for females. The per capita income for the city was $14,264. About 7.6% of families and 10.1% of the population were below the poverty line, including 11.4% of those under age 18 and 26.5% of those age 65 or over.

Education 
The community is served by Holcomb USD 363 public school district.  Residents are zoned to Holcomb Elementary School (grades 3–5), Wiley Elementary School (Preschool-2), Holcomb Middle School (grades 6–8), or Holcomb High School (grades 9–12).

Notable person
Charles Plymell, Beat poet, publisher

See also

 Holcomb High School
 Santa Fe Trail

References

Further reading

 Story of the Marking of the Santa Fe Trail by the Daughters of the American Revolution in Kansas and the State of Kansas''; Almira Cordry; Crane Co; 164 pages; 1915.

External links
 City of Holcomb
 Holcomb - Directory of Public Officials
 Holcomb city map, KDOT

Cities in Kansas
Cities in Finney County, Kansas
Kansas populated places on the Arkansas River